The Chap is a British humorous men's lifestyle magazine published quarterly. It was founded in 1999 by Gustav Temple and Vic Darkwood, and is still edited by Temple.

The magazine proposes that men everywhere return to a more gentlemanly way of life by rejecting modern vulgarity and careless, shabby or faddish dress sense through the restoration of the lifestyle, habits, manners and traditional fashion sense of a mid-20th century (or earlier) British chap. Thus it advises men to wear traditional British suits and other similar well-tailored clothing, especially those cut from tweed; to keep their trousers sharply pressed; to be impeccably groomed; to wear quality handmade shoes, brightly polished; and to return to the everyday wearing of hats.

The Chap has a comic and eccentric twist on this. Tongue firmly in cheek, it espouses its own unique lifestyle philosophy called anarcho-dandyism and has its own 10-point manifesto, The Chap Manifesto, which mandates that a chap is to smoke a pipe, is to doff his hat when good manners require, is never to wear what it calls pantaloons de Nîmes, and to sport a moustache (never a beard), among others.

Content
While The Chap appreciates British culture and loves tradition, it is strongly rooted in the Situationist strand of anarchism with more than the occasional nod to Dada. It is also indebted to the avant-garde as well as comedy greats such as the Monty Pythons, Peter Cook, Spike Milligan and Viv Stanshall.

The Chap is a mixture of articles on clothing, footwear and headwear; on sport (mainly cricket and horse racing); on moustache grooming; on polite manners and traditional British etiquette; and on pipes and tobacco, all written in an anachronistic late-Victorian to mid-20th Century British style, interspersed with humorous jokes. For instance, the "Am I Chap" section sees people sending in photos of themselves dressed in vintage attire, to which the magazine's editors almost always comment on derisively in a very withering, but humorous, fashion.

The Chap also features articles on a diverse range of things related to Chappism, such as tales of First World War and Second World War military derring-do, stories or tips on unusual ways to travel when abroad, or the late Victorian and Edwardian martial art of Bartitsu.

The magazine has often been very satirical or whimsical, with content such as a series chronicling "A Year in Catford" and "Amusing Monograph as to the Various Pleasures and Diversions Afforded by One's Valet".

Notable contributors to The Chap include Michael "Atters" Attree who conducts interviews with those known for their gentlemanly or dandyish ways, and Miss Martindale, a prominent spokesperson of Aristasia, who from 2003 to 2005 wrote the Ladies' Column. Its current literary editor is the author and historian Alexander Larman.

Publication history
The magazine is printed in B5 format, and originally was published in that format as well. In May 2009, the magazine nearly closed due to financial issues arising from moving from B5 to the larger A4 format. To keep going The Chap asked its readership and subscribers to donate funds. Additionally, Viz Magazine financially supported the magazine. It returned to B5 to reduce printing costs.

The Chap was published bi-monthly from 1999 to May 2017.

From issue #92 published in May 2017, the magazine has been published quarterly, has double the number of pages, and has been graphically redesigned. On this "relaunch" the editor said:

Chap events
The Chap used to host the annual summer Chap Olympiad which was normally held in Bedford Square Gardens in London.

The magazine has also conducted a number of balls called the Grand Anarcho-Dandyist Balls.

Chap protests
The magazine has also organised several serious and semi-serious protests, all conducted in the unique tongue-in-cheek Chap style. These include:
 in 2003, the Chap Uprising – against what they see as modern living's vulgarity in general;
 in 2004, the Victoria & Albert Museum Protest –  a protest "against the pointless intrusion by contemporary art pieces into public areas";
 in 2004, Civilise the City – a walk through central London whose aim was "to draw attention to the appalling lack of gentlemanly services available on Britain's high streets";
 in 2006, the Tate Modern Protest – against modern art installations; and
 in 2012, the Siege of Savile Row – against the proposed opening of an Abercrombie and Fitch store at the centre of traditional English gentleman's tailoring, Savile Row.

Chap publications
In addition to the magazine, a number of books have been published by The Chap over the years: these include How To Be Chap and books both on cooking and drinking for "chaps".

References

External links
Official website
The Chap Olympiad official website
The 11th annual Chap Olympiad (2015) in pictures from The Daily Telegraph
BBC News coverage of the Chap Olympiad 2006
There's a good Chap from The Independent from 2003
The Vulgarian Invasions - interview with Gustav Temple from 3:AM Magazine
Well Trousered, Sir: Gustav Temple Talks All Things Chap from the Sabotage Times

1999 establishments in the United Kingdom
Quarterly magazines published in the United Kingdom
Men's magazines published in the United Kingdom
Humor magazines
Magazines established in 1999